The National Front for the Salvation of Bulgaria (NFSB), is an ultranationalist political party in Bulgaria.

History
The party was established on 17 May 2011 in sports hall Boycho Branzov in Burgas. Its founding was attended by over 820 people from across the country, mainly from the cities of Varna, Shumen, Asenovgrad, Pazardzhik, Plovdiv, Vratsa, Svilengrad, Lovech, Chirpan, Stara Zagora, Vidin and Dobrich.

The party elected three leaders - Valeri Simeonov, Valentin Kasabov and Dancho Hadzhiev. The Secretary of the party is Maria Petrova. The National Political Council includes 19 people, such as independent councilors from Burgas and hosts from SKAT TV (i.e. Velizar Enchev and Valentin Fartunov).

Among the party's founders and is former regional president of the Union of Democratic Forces in the city Vladimir Pavlov.

The party was member of the Europe of Freedom and Democracy (EFD) group during the 7th European Parliament.

On 3 August 2014 a coalition agreement was signed between NFSB and IMRO – Bulgarian National Movement called Patriotic Front for the 2014 parliamentary elections. It states its purpose to be for "a revival of the Bulgarian economy, a fight against monopolies, achieving modern education and healthcare and a fair and uncorrupt judiciary." The members of the alliance are: PROUD, National Ideal for Unity, European Middle Class, Association Patriot, Undivided Bulgaria, National Movement BG Patriot, Union of the Patriotic Forces "Defense", National Association of Alternate Soldiery "For the Honor of epaulette", National Movement for the Salvation of the Fatherland and National Democratic Party.

Ahead of the 2021 Bulgarian parliamentary election, Volya Movement formed an electoral alliance with the National Front for the Salvation of Bulgaria. and the IMRO – Bulgarian National Movement.

Administration
 Leader - Valeri Simeonov
 Vice-leader - Valentin Kasabov
 Vice-leader - Dancho Hadzhiev
 Vice-leader - Boris Yachev
 Secretary - Maria Petrova

Election results

Presidential
The party nominated Stefan Solakov as their presidential candidate in 2011 and Galina Vasileva as his running mate.

They finished 5th, receiving 84,205 votes (2.50% of ballots cast).

Local
In the local elections in Burgas in 2011, party chairman Valeri Simeonov finished in second place, with 11.25% of the votes.

Parliamentary
In the parliamentary elections on May 12, the "National Front for the Salvation of Bulgaria" won 3.7% of the votes, but fell below the 4% threshold needed for representation. Nonetheless the party polled more votes than the UDF, DSB and OLJ, all of whom were represented in the last (41st) National Assembly.

European
In the European parliament elections on May 25, the "National Front for the Salvation of Bulgaria" won 3.05% of the votes, but fell below the 6% threshold needed for representation.

References

External links
 Official site
 NFSB - SKAT TV

Nationalist parties in Bulgaria
Eurosceptic parties in Bulgaria
Conservative parties in Bulgaria
Bulgarian nationalism
2011 establishments in Bulgaria
Political parties established in 2011
Eastern Orthodox political parties
National conservative parties
Far-right parties in Europe